Chen Qian (born 26 January 1990) is a Chinese team handball player. She plays for the Anhui HC, and on the Chinese national team. She represented China at the 2013 World Women's Handball Championship in Serbia, where the Chinese team placed 18th.

References

Chinese female handball players
1990 births
Living people
Handball players at the 2014 Asian Games
Asian Games competitors for China